John Nathan "Dutch" Levine (January 19, 1881 – January 6, 1950) was an American college football player and coach. He served as the head football coach at Davidson College in 1908 and at Transylvania University from 1909 to 1911, compiling a career coaching record of 12–16–5.

Levine moved from Great Neck, New York to Farmington, Maine in 1949. He died at his home there, on January 6, 1950.

Head coaching record

References

External links
 

1881 births
1950 deaths
Colby Mules football players
Davidson Wildcats football coaches
Transylvania Pioneers athletic directors
Transylvania Pioneers football coaches
Yale Bulldogs football players
Polish emigrants to the United States